Galeshi, Rudbari or Deylami  is a dialect of the Gilaki language spoken in the mountains of southern and south-eastern Gilan and western Mazandaran.

Distribution
This dialect is spoken in the foothills and mountainous areas south and southeast of Gilan, including Rudbar, Rostamabad, Siahkal and Deylaman, Amlash, Rahimabad, Ashkorat, and also in the west of Mazandaran such as Ramsar and Tonekabon.

Status
Due to the fact that the Galesh lived in remote areas and generally had less contact with the people of the plains and human settlements, their dialect has remained intact. Therefore, Galeshi Gilaki is more authentic than Gilaki in urban areas. Regardless, the Gilaki dialect of the Galesh is very similar to the dialect of the people of East Gilan and West Mazandaran, except for Lahijan.

Grammar

Pronouns
In the Galashi dialect, pronouns have three cases: active, passive and possessive.

References

Northwestern Iranian languages